Ross Macdonald was the main pseudonym used by the American-Canadian writer of crime fiction Kenneth Millar (December 13, 1915 – July 11, 1983). He is best known for his series of hardboiled novels set in Southern California and featuring private detective Lew Archer. Since the 1970s, Macdonald's works (particularly the Archer novels) have received attention in academic circles for their psychological depth, sense of place, use of language, sophisticated imagery and integration of philosophy into genre fiction.

Brought up in the province of Ontario, Canada, Macdonald eventually settled in the state of California, where he died in 1983.

Life
Millar was born in Los Gatos, California, and raised in his Canadian parents' native Kitchener, Ontario. Millar was a Scots spelling of the surname Miller, and the author pronounced his name Miller rather than Millar. When his father abandoned the family unexpectedly when Millar was four years old, he and his mother lived with various relatives, and he had moved several times by his 16th year. Back in Canada as a young adult, he returned to Kitchener, where he studied, and subsequently graduated from the University of Western Ontario with an Honors degree in History and English. He found work as a high school teacher. Some years later, he attended the University of Michigan and received a PhD in 1952. He married Margaret Sturm in 1938, though they'd known each other earlier in high school. They had a daughter in 1939, Linda, who died in 1970. The family moved from Kitchener to Santa Barbara in 1946.

Millar began his career writing stories for pulp magazines and used his real name for his first four novels. Of these he completed the last, The Dark Tunnel, in 1944. After serving at sea as a naval communications officer from 1944 to 1946, Millar returned to Michigan, where he obtained his Ph.D. degree in literature. For his doctorate, Millar studied under poet W.H. Auden, who (unusually for a prominent literary intellectual of the era) held mystery or detective fiction could rise to the level of literature and encouraged Millar's interest in the genre.

For his fifth novel, in 1949, he wrote under the name John Macdonald (his father's first and middle names) in order to avoid confusion with his wife, who was achieving her own success writing as Margaret Millar. He then changed his pen name briefly to John Ross Macdonald, before settling on Ross Macdonald (Ross borrowed from a favorite cousin) in order to avoid being confused with fellow mystery writer John D. MacDonald, who was writing under his real name.  Millar would use the pseudonym "Ross Macdonald" on all his fiction from the mid '50s forward.

Most of his books were set primarily in and around his adopted hometown of Santa Barbara. In these works, the city where Lew Archer is based goes under the fictional name of Santa Teresa.

In 1983 Macdonald died of Alzheimer's disease.

Work
Macdonald first introduced the tough but humane private eye Lew Archer in the 1946 short story "Find the Woman" (credited then to "Ken Millar"). A full-length novel featuring him, The Moving Target, followed in 1949 and was the first in a series of eighteen. Macdonald mentions in the foreword to the Archer in Hollywood omnibus that his detective derives his name from Sam Spade's partner, Miles Archer, and from Lew(is) Wallace, author of Ben-Hur, though the character was patterned on Philip Marlowe. Macdonald also stated the surname "Archer" was inspired by his own astrological sign of Sagittarius the archer.

The novels were hailed by genre fans and literary critics alike. The Lew Archer novels are recognized as some of the most significant American mystery books of the mid 20th century, bringing a literary sophistication to the genre. The critic John Leonard declared that Macdonald had surpassed the limits of crime fiction to become "a major American novelist". He has also been called the primary heir to Dashiell Hammett and Raymond Chandler as the master of American hardboiled mysteries.

Macdonald's writing built on the pithy style of his predecessors by adding psychological depth and insights into the motivations of his characters. Their plots of "baroque splendor" were complicated and often turned on Archer's unearthing family secrets of upwardly mobile clients, sometimes going back over several generations. Lost or wayward sons and daughters were a theme common to many of the novels. Critics have commented favorably on Macdonald's deft combination of the two sides of the mystery genre, the "whodunit" and the psychological thriller. Even his regular readers seldom saw a Macdonald denouement coming.

Screenwriter William Goldman, who adapted Macdonald's The Moving Target to film as Harper in 1966, called his works "the finest series of detective novels ever written by an American". A later film adaptation was The Drowning Pool (1975), also starring Paul Newman as the detective "Lew Harper". In addition, The Underground Man was adapted as a TV movie in 1974.

Tom Nolan in his Ross Macdonald, A Biography, wrote, "By any standard he was remarkable. His first books, patterned on Hammett and Chandler, were at once vivid chronicles of a postwar California and elaborate retellings of Greek and other classic myths. Gradually he swapped the hard-boiled trappings for more subjective themes: personal identity, the family secret, the family scapegoat, the childhood trauma; how men and women need and battle each other, how the buried past rises like a skeleton to confront the present. He brought the tragic drama of Freud and the psychology of Sophocles to detective stories, and his prose flashed with poetic imagery."

In a 2017 book review, the Wall Street Journal provided this summary of the author's style:"... it is the sheer beauty of Macdonald’s laconic style—with its seductive rhythms and elegant plainness—that holds us spellbound. 'Hard-boiled,' 'noir,' 'mystery,' it doesn’t matter what you call it. Macdonald, with insolent grace, blows past the barrier constructed by Dorothy Sayers between “the literature of escape” and “the literature of expression.” These novels, triumphs of his literary alchemy, dare to be both."

Recognition

According to the New York Times, "some critics ranked him among the best American novelists of his generation." William Goldman of the newspaper's Book Review section wrote that the Archer books were "the finest series of detective novels ever written by an American".

Over his career, Macdonald was presented with several awards. In 1964, the Mystery Writers of America awarded the author the Silver Dagger award for "The Chill." Ten years later, he received the Grand Master Award from the Mystery Writers of America, and in 1982 he received "The Eye," the Lifetime Achievement Shamus Award from the Private Eye Writers of America. In 1982, he was awarded the Robert Kirsch Award by the Los Angeles Times for "an outstanding body of work by an author from the West or featuring the West."

Bibliography

Writing as Kenneth Millar
 The Dark Tunnel (a.k.a. I Die Slowly) – 1944
 Trouble Follows Me (a.k.a. Night Train) – 1946
 Blue City – 1947 (filmed with Judd Nelson as Blue City, 1986)
 The Three Roads – 1948 (filmed with Michael Sarrazin as Deadly Companion, 1980)

These first four novels, all non-series standalones, were initially published using Millar's real name,  but have since been intermittently reissued using his literary pseudonym, Ross Macdonald.

Other non-series novels
Two later non-series novels were also published:  
 Meet Me at the Morgue (aka Experience With Evil) – 1953, credited to John Ross Macdonald
 The Ferguson Affair – 1960, credited to Ross Macdonald

Lew Archer

Novels
 The Moving Target – 1949 (filmed with Paul Newman as Harper, 1966)
 The Drowning Pool – 1950 (also filmed with Paul Newman as The Drowning Pool, 1975)
 The Way Some People Die – 1951
 The Ivory Grin (aka Marked for Murder) – 1952
 Meet Me at the Morgue (aka 'Experience with Evil') - 1953
 Find a Victim – 1954
 The Barbarous Coast – 1956
 The Doomsters – 1958
 The Galton Case – 1959
 The Wycherly Woman – 1961
 The Zebra-Striped Hearse – 1962
 The Chill – 1964
 The Far Side of the Dollar – 1965 (1965 CWA Gold Dagger Award winner)
 Black Money – 1966
 The Instant Enemy – 1968
 The Goodbye Look – 1969 (filmed as Tayna 1992)
 The Underground Man – 1971 (filmed as a television series pilot in 1974)
 Sleeping Beauty – 1973
 The Blue Hammer – 1976

Short story collections
 The Name Is Archer (paperback original containing seven stories) – 1955
 Lew Archer: Private Investigator (The Name Is Archer + two additional stories) – 1977
 Strangers in Town (unpublished drafts edited by Tom Nolan) - 2001
 The Archer Files, The Complete Short Stories of Lew Archer Private Investigator, Including Newly Discovered Case Notes, ed. Tom Nolan – 2007.  

Omnibuses
 Archer in Hollywood – 1967 includes The Moving Target, The Way Some People Die, and The Barbarous Coast. Archer at Large – 1970 includes The Galton Case, The Chill, and Black Money.
 Archer in Jeopardy – 1979 includes The Doomsters, The Zebra-Striped Hearse, and The Instant Enemy.
 Archer, P.I.—includes The Ivory Grin, The Zebra-Striped Hearse and The Underground Man.  Mystery Guild, 1990. Collects three Vintage Crime/Black Lizard printings.
 Ross MacDonald: Four Novels of the 1950s - May 2015, Library of America, includes The Way Some People Die, The Barbarous Coast, The Doomsters, and The Galton Case.
 Ross MacDonald: Three Novels of the Early 1960s - April 2016, Library of America, includes The Zebra-Striped Hearse, The Chill and The Far Side of the Dollar.
 Ross MacDonald: Four Later Novels - July 2017, Library of America, includes Black Money, The Instant Enemy, The Goodbye Look, and The Underground ManBritish omnibuses
Allison & Busby published three Archer omnibus editions in the 1990s.
 The Lew Archer Omnibus. Vol. 1. includes The Drowning Pool, The Chill  and The Goodbye Look.
 The Lew Archer Omnibus. Vol. 2. includes The Moving Target, The Barbarous Coast, and The Far Side of the Dollar The Lew Archer Omnibus. Vol. 3. includes The Ivory Grin, The Galton Case, and The Blue Hammer.

Non-fiction
 On Crime Writing – 1973, Santa Barbara : Capra Press, Series title: Yes! Capra chapbook series; no. 11, The Library of Congress bibliographic information includes this note: "Writing The Galton case."
 Self-Portrait, Ceaselessly Into the Past – 1981, Santa Barbara : Capra Press, collection of book prefaces, magazine articles and interviews.

Notes

References

Bruccoli, Matthew J. Ross Macdonald. San Diego: Harcourt Brace Jovanovich, 1984.  | 
"Ross Macdonald: Family Affairs" in S. T. Joshi, Varieties of Crime Fiction, pp. 97–106, (Wildside Press, 2019) 
Kreyling, Michael. "The Novels of Ross Macdonald" University of South Carolina Press, 2005.  
Nolan, Tom. Ross Macdonald: A Biography. New York: Scribner, 1999. 
Nolan, Tom.  "The Archer Files".  Crippen & Landru 2007
Schopen, Bernard A., "Ross MacDonald", Twayne Publishers, Boston, 1990. 

External links

 Marling, William, "Hard-Boiled Fiction", Case Western Reserve University
 J. Kingston Pierce, "50 Years with Lew Archer: An Anniversary Tribute to Ross Macdonald and His Heroic Yet Compassionate Private Eye,  by January Magazine, April 1999]
 Lew Archer oder:Der Detektiv als Statthalter konkreter Utopie'' An interview with Macdonald
 Leonard Cassuto, "The last testament of Ross Macdonald",  The Boston Globe, 11/2/2003

1915 births
1983 deaths
20th-century American novelists
20th-century American short story writers
American male novelists
American male short story writers
American mystery writers
American people of Canadian descent
Edgar Award winners
People from Los Gatos, California
Shamus Award winners
University of Michigan alumni
Writers from Ann Arbor, Michigan
Writers from Kitchener, Ontario
Writers from Santa Barbara, California
20th-century Canadian male writers
Novelists from Michigan
Canadian male novelists
20th-century Canadian novelists
20th-century Canadian short story writers
Canadian male short story writers
Canadian mystery writers
Deaths from dementia in California
Deaths from Alzheimer's disease
20th-century American male writers
United States Navy personnel of World War II
United States Navy officers